State Route 225 (SR 225) is a  route that serves as a connection between Stockton and Spanish Fort in western Baldwin County, Alabama, United States.

Route description
The southern terminus of SR 225 is located at its intersection with US 31 in Spanish Fort. From this point, the route generally travels in a northward direction, intersecting with Interstate 65 (I-65) at exit 31 before terminating 3 miles north of the interchange at SR 59 in Stockton.

Major intersections

References

External links

Alabama 225 Ends
Alabama 225 at Southeastroads.com

225
Transportation in Baldwin County, Alabama